Casey Beyers (born March 21, 1994) is an American soccer player who currently plays for FC Baltimore Christos in the National Premier Soccer League.

Career

College & Amateur
Beyers played four years of college soccer at the University of Wisconsin–Madison between 2013 and 2016. Beyers also appeared for Premier Development League side D.C. United U-23 in 2015.

In 2019, Beyers signed with FC Baltimore Christos of the National Premier Soccer League, appearing in six regular season games as the team finished first in its conference. He also started in goal during the team's 2019 U.S. Open Cup First Round match against West Chester United SC, where Baltimore fell in a penalty kick shootout.

Professional
Beyers signed with United Soccer League side Orange County SC on March 3, 2017.

References

External links

1994 births
Living people
People from Columbia, Maryland
Wisconsin Badgers men's soccer players
D.C. United U-23 players
Orange County SC players
Association football goalkeepers
Soccer players from Maryland
USL League Two players
USL Championship players
American soccer players